Georg Mühlen-Schulte (1882–1981) was a German novelist, journalist and humourist. He was editor-in-chief of the Berlin-based satirical magazine Lustige Blätter. He also worked as a lyricist for several songs, and was employed as a screenwriter. Several of his novels were made into films including The Call of the Jungle (1936), The Impossible Mister Pitt (1938) and The Thing About Styx (1942). In October 1933 he was one of 87 writers who made a Vow of Allegiance to Adolf Hitler.

References

Bibliography
 Goble, Alan. The Complete Index to Literary Sources in Film. Walter de Gruyter, 1999.
 Hardt, Ursula. From Caligari to California: Erich Pommer's life in the International Film Wars. Berghahn Books, 1996.

External links

1882 births
1981 deaths
German screenwriters
German journalists

de:Georg Mühlen-Schulte